Stodart is a surname. Notable people with the surname include:

Robert Stodart (1748–1813), British piano maker
William Stodart (1792–1838), British piano maker
Anthony Stodart (1916–2003), Scottish politician
Frank Stodart (1885–1944), Australian rules footballer
James Stodart (1849–1922), Australian politician
William Stodart (1904–1990), New Zealand rower
Romeo Stodart (1977-Present ) Singer/Songwriter, Musician, Music Producer

See also
Stoddart
Stoddard (disambiguation)